Vasula is a genus of sea snails, marine gastropod mollusks in the family Muricidae, the murex snails or rock snails.

Species
 Vasula deltoidea (Lamarck, 1822)
 Vasula melones (Duclos, 1832)
 Vasula speciosa (Valenciennes, 1832)

References

 Claremont, M., Vermeij, G. J., Williams, S. T. & Reid, D. G. (2013). Global phylogeny and new classification of the Rapaninae (Gastropoda: Muricidae), dominant molluscan predators on tropical rocky seashores. Molecular Phylogenetics and Evolution. 66: 91–102

External links
 Mörch, O. A. L. (1860). Beiträge zur Molluskenfauna Central-Amerika's. Malakozoologische Blätter. 7: 66–106

 
Gastropod genera